The Flamin' Thongs is an Australian children's animated television series screening on ABC3 from 9 May 2014. The 26 12-minute episodes (written by Simon Dodd and Bruce Griffiths) follow the plans of the dysfunctional Thong Family, as they try to put their small hometown of Whale Bay on the map. The family consists of parents Trevor and Brenda, their 12-year-old son Holden and 14-year-old daughter Narelle. Holden's best friend, Rerp, is a cane toad in a school uniform. The family are depicted as a stereotypical 'Aussie' family with Australian slang and iconic objects included in the show.

Cast
 Brandon Burns as Holden Thong
 Mark Mitchell as Trevor Thong
 Denise Drysdale as Brenda Thong (26 episodes, 2014)
 Kate McLennan as Narelle Thong 
 André de Vanny as Kevin
 Tony Martin as various characters (8 episodes, 2014)
 Abbe Holmes
 Hamish Hughes
 Marg Downey
 Bob Franklin
 Rod Mullinar

References

External links
 Official website
 The Flamin' Thongs at ABC 
 The Flamin' Thongs at 12 Field Animation Studio
 

Australian Broadcasting Corporation original programming
Animated television series about children
Animated television series about dysfunctional families
Australian children's animated comedy television series
Australian computer-animated television series
2014 Australian television series debuts
2010s Australian animated television series